Yodo may refer to:

Geography
 The Yodo River in Osaka Prefecture, Japan
 Yodo, Kyoto, a neighborhood in Fushimi-ku, Kyoto, Japan
 Yōdo Station, East Japan Railway station on the Hachikō Line in Yorii, Saitama
 Ryŏdo (also spelled Yŏdo), island in Wonsan harbour, Kangwon Province, North Korea

People
 Yodo-dono (1567 or 69 – 1615), a concubine of Toyotomi Hideyoshi
 Yamauchi Yōdō (1827–1872), Japanese daimyō in the Shikoku region in the late Edo period

Entertainment
 "Yodo", the lead single from the album Apex Predator by Crooked I
 Yōdō, Japanese entertainment agency which represents Yosuke Kishi
 "Yōdō", a 2013 episode of Japanese animated series Coppelion

Other
 Japanese cruiser Yodo